The Monogatari Japanese anime television series is based on the light novel series of the same name, written by Nisio Isin with illustrations by Vofan. The anime is directed by several directors and produced by the animation studio Shaft. The series debuted with Bakemonogatari and aired 12 episodes between July 3 and September 25, 2009, on the Tokyo MX television station. Three additional original net animation episodes were distributed on the anime's official website between November 3, 2009, and June 25, 2010. A sequel titled Nisemonogatari aired 11 episodes between January 7 and March 17, 2012.

A prequel to the original series titled Nekomonogatari (Black) aired four episodes back-to-back on December 31, 2012. Six further sequels were later adapted under the common moniker of Monogatari Series Second Season: Nekomonogatari (White), Kabukimonogatari, Otorimonogatari, Onimonogatari, and Koimonogatari aired between July 6 and December 28, 2013, whereas Hanamonogatari, which was originally meant to air with the others in 2013, was postponed and eventually broadcast separately on August 16, 2014. The "final season" of the novels were adapted as Tsukimonogatari, Owarimonogatari, Koyomimonogatari, and Zoku Owarimonogatari  which aired from December 31, 2014, through June 22, 2019. An adaptation of the prequel to Bakemonogatari, titled Kizumonogatari, was announced in 2010 but delayed for six years until finally being released as a film trilogy from January 8, 2016, to January 6, 2017.

Series overview

Television series

Bakemonogatari
Bakemonogatari was directed by Akiyuki Shinbo and Tatsuya Oishi at Shaft, has animation character designs and chief animation direction by Akio Watanabe, and features music composed by Satoru Kōsaki. The season's scripts were written by Yukito Kizawa (Hitagi Crab, Mayoi Snail, Tsubasa Cat) and Muneo Nakamoto (Suruga Monkey, Nadeko Snake) of Seven Days War under the supervision of Shinbo and Shaft. Episodes 4, 6, and 9 were outsourced to other studios by Shaft: episode 4 to Mushi Production, and episodes 6 and 9 to Silver Link. 

The season features six pieces of theme music: five opening themes, and one ending theme. , the ending theme, was produced by Supercell and was sung by Nagi Yanagi. Each of the opening themes was composed by Satoru Kōsaki and written by Meg Rock, featuring vocals from one of the main female characters. The first opening, "staple stable", was sung by Chiwa Saitō (Hitagi Senjougahara); the second opening, was sung by Emiri Katō (Mayoi Hachikuji); the third opening, "ambivalent world", was sung by Miyuki Sawashiro (Suruga Kanbaru); the fourth opening, was sung by Kana Hanazawa (Nadeko Sengoku); and the fifth opening, "sugar sweet nightmare", was sung by Yui Horie (Hanekawa Tsubasa).

Nisemonogatari
Nisemonogatari was directed by Akiyuki Shinbo and Tomoyuki Itamura at Shaft, has animation character designs and chief animation direction by Akio Watanabe, and features music composed by Satoru Kōsaki. The series' scripts were written by Yukito Kizawa (Karen Bee) and Muneo Nakamoto (Tsukihi Phoenix) of Seven Days War under the supervision of Shinbo and Shaft. Episodes 5 and 6 were outsourced to other studios by Shaft: episode 5 to Digital Network Animation, and episode 6 to Doga Kobo. Openings 2 and 3 of the series were also animated with assistance from Point Pictures.

The season features four pieces of theme music: three opening themes, and one ending theme. , the ending theme, was sung by ClariS and written by Ryo of Supercell. Each of the opening themes was again composed by Satoru Kōsaki, written by Meg Rock, and sung by members of the female cast. The first opening, was sung by Chiwa Saitō (Hitagi Senjougahara); the second opening, "marshmallow justice", was sung by Eri Kitamura (Karen Araragi); and the third opening, was sung by Yuka Iguchi (Tsuhiki Araragi).

Nekomonogatari (Black)
Nekomonogatari (Black) was directed by Tomoyuki Itamura under the chief direction of Akiyuki Shinbo at Shaft, has animation character designs by Akio Watanabe, and features music composed by Satoru Kōsaki. Watanabe served as chief animation director alongside Shaft animator Nobuhiro Sugiyama. The season's scripts were written by Yukito Kizawa (episodes 1–2) and Muneo Nakamoto (episodes 3–4) of Seven Days War under the supervision of Shinbo and Shaft.

The season features two pieces of theme music: one opening theme, and one ending theme. , the ending theme, was written by Saori Kodama, composed by Satoru Kōsaki, and sung by Marina Kawano. The opening theme, "perfect slumbers", was composed by Satoru Kōsaki, written by Meg Rock, and sung by cast member Yui Horie (Tsubasa Hanekawa).

Nekomonogatari (White)
Nekomonogatari (White) was directed by Tomoyuki Itamura under the chief direction of Akiyuki Shinbo at Shaft, has animation character designs by Akio Watanabe, and features music composed by Satoru Kōsaki. Watanabe, Shaft animator Nobuhiro Sugiyama, and Taisuke Iwasaki served as chief animation directors; and the season's scripts were written by Yukito Kizawa (episodes 1–2, 4–5) and Muneo Nakamoto (episode 3) of Seven Days War under the supervision of Shinbo and Shaft. One episode was outsourced outside of Shaft: episode 4 to Studio CJT.

The season features two pieces of theme music: one opening theme, and one ending theme. , the ending theme, was produced by Jin (Shizen no Teki-P) and sung by Luna Haruna. The opening theme, "chocolate insomnia", was composed by Satoru Kōsaki, written by Meg Rock, and sung by cast member Yui Horie (Tsubasa Hanekawa).

Kabukimonogatari
Kabukimonogatari was directed by Naoyuki Tatsuwa and Tomoyuki Itamura under the chief direction of Akiyuki Shinbo at Shaft, has animation character designs by Akio Watanabe, and features music composed by Satoru Kōsaki. Watanabe, Shaft animator Nobuhiro Sugiyama, and Taisuke Iwasaki served as chief animation directors; and the season's scripts were written by Yukito Kizawa (episodes 1, 3–4) and Muneo Nakamoto (episode 2) of Write Works under the supervision of Shinbo and Shaft. The opening theme was produced with assistance from Cyclone Graphics.

The season features two pieces of theme music: one opening theme, and one ending theme. , from Nekomonogatari (White), was again used as the ending theme for this season. The opening theme, "happy bite", was composed by Satoru Kōsaki, written by Meg Rock, and sung by cast member Emiri Katō (Mayoi Hachikuji).

Otorimonogatari
Otorimonogatari was directed by Tomoyuki Itamura under the chief direction of Akiyuki Shinbo at Shaft, has animation character designs by Akio Watanabe, and features music composed by Satoru Kōsaki. Watanabe, Shaft animator Nobuhiro Sugiyama, and Taisuke Iwasaki served as chief animation directors; and the season's scripts were written by Yukito Kizawa of Write Works under the supervision of Shinbo and Shaft.

The season features two pieces of theme music: one opening theme, and one ending theme. , the ending theme, was composed by Satoru Kōsaki, written by Saori Kodama, and sung by Marina Kawano. The opening theme, was composed by Satoru Kōsaki, written by Meg Rock, and sung by cast member Kana Hanazawa (Nadeko Sengoku).

Onimonogatari
Onimonogatari was directed by Yuki Yase and Tomoyuki Itamura under the chief direction of Akiyuki Shinbo at Shaft, has animation character designs by Akio Watanabe, and features music composed by Satoru Kōsaki. Watanabe, Shaft animator Nobuhiro Sugiyama, and Taisuke Iwasaki served as chief animation directors; and the season's scripts were written by Muneo Nakamoto of Write Works under the supervision of Shinbo and Shaft.

The season features two pieces of theme music: one opening theme, and one ending theme. , from Otorimonogatari, was again used as the ending theme. The opening theme, "white lies", was composed by Mito and written by Meg Rock. This season features one of two instances in which a member of the female cast did not sing the opening theme, in both instances being Shinobu Oshino's voice actress Maaya Sakamoto.

Koimonogatari
Koimonogatari was directed by Tomoyuki Itamura under the chief direction of Akiyuki Shinbo at Shaft, has animation character designs by Akio Watanabe, and features music composed by Satoru Kōsaki. Watanabe, Shaft animator Nobuhiro Sugiyama, and Taisuke Iwasaki served as chief animation directors; and the season's scripts were written by Yukito Kizawa (episodes 1–3, 5–6) and Muneo Nakamoto (episode 4) of Write Works under the supervision of Shinbo and Shaft.

The season features three pieces of theme music: two opening themes, and one ending theme. "snowdrop", the ending theme, was written by Meg Rock, composed by Hidekazu Tanaka, and sung by Marina Kawano and Luna Haruna. The opening theme for the first three episodes, "fast love", was composed by Satoru Kōsaki, written by Meg Rock, and sung by cast member Chiwa Saitō (Hitagi Senjougahara). An alternate version of "fast love",  has additional vocals by cast member Shin-ichiro Miki (Deishuu Kaiki), and was used in the last three episodes. It is the first instance in which a male cast member sang an opening.

The arc's opening is unique in that it features Osamu Kamijou acting as a character designer, and is the one of two instances in the franchise to feature another character designer besides Akio Watanabe (the other being the Kizumonogatari trilogy). The opening was also produced with assistance from Point Pictures.

Hanamonogatari
Hanamonogatari was directed by Tomoyuki Itamura under the chief direction of Akiyuki Shinbo at Shaft, has animation character designs by Akio Watanabe, and features music composed by Kei Haneoka. Watanabe and Taisuke Iwasaki served as the season's chief animation direcotrs; and the season's scripts were written by Yukito Kizawa (episode 1) and Muneo Nakamoto (episodes 2–5) of Write Works under the supervision of Shinbo and Shaft.

The season features two pieces of theme music: one opening theme, and one ending theme. "the last day of my adolescence", the opening theme, was composed by Mito, written by Meg Rock, and sung by cast member Miyuki Sawashiro (Suruga Kanbaru). The ending theme, was composed by Katsuhiko Kurosu, written by Saori Kodama, and sung by Marina Kawano.

Tsukimonogatari
Tsukimonogatari was directed by Tomoyuki Itamura under the chief direction of Akiyuki Shinbo at Shaft, has animation character designs by Akio Watanabe, and features music composed by Kei Haneoka. Watanabe and Taisuke Iwasaki served as the season's chief animation directors; and the season's scripts were written by Yukito Kizawa (episodes 1–2) and Muneo Nakamoto (episodes 3–4) of Write Works under the supervision of Shinbo and Shaft.

The season features two pieces of theme music: one opening theme, and one ending theme. "border", the ending theme, was composed by Ryōsuke Shigenaga, written by Meg Rock, and performed by ClariS. The opening theme, was composed by Mito, written by Meg Rock, and sung by cast member Saori Hayami (Yotsugi Ononoki). The opening animation was again produced with assistance from Point Pictures.

Owarimonogatari I
Owarimonogatari I was directed by Tomoyuki Itamura under the chief direction of Akiyuki Shinbo at Shaft, has animation character designs by Akio Watanabe, and features music composed by Kei Haneoka. Watanabe, Taisuke Iwasaki, and Shinya Nishizawa served as the seaon's chief animation directors; and the season's scripts were written by Yukito Kizawa (episodes 1–2, 4–5, 8–9) and Muneo Nakamoto (episodes 3, 6–7, 10–13) of Write Works under the supervision of Shinbo and Shaft. Episodes 3, 4, 8, and 10 were outsourced to Diomedéa. Opening 2 was also animated with assistance from Point Pictures.

The season features five pieces of theme music: four opening themes, and one ending theme. , the ending theme, was composed by Alisa Takigawa and Saku, written by Takigawa, and performed by Takigawa. All of the opening themes were composed by Mito and written by Meg Rock, and 3/4 of them feature vocals by members of the cast. The first opening, "decent black", was sung by Kaori Mizuhashi (Ougi Oshino); the second opening, "mathemagics", was sung by Marina Inoue (Sodachi Oikura); the third opening, was also sung by Marina Inoue; and the fourth opening, "mein schatz", does not feature any of the cast's vocals.

Owarimonogatari II
Owarimonogatari II was directed by Tomoyuki Itamura under the chief direction of Akiyuki Shinbo at Shaft, has animation character designs by Akio Watanabe, and features music composed by Kei Haneoka. Watanabe, Taisuke Iwasaki, and Studio Wanpack animator Kana Miyai served as the season's chief animation directors; and the season's scripts were co-written by Yukito Kizawa and Muneo Nakamoto of Write Works under the supervision of Shinbo and Shaft.

The season features four pieces of theme music: three opening themes, and one ending theme. "SHIORI", the ending theme, was composed and written by Tomoyuki Ogawa, and was performed by ClariS. The first opening, "terminal terminal", was composed by Mito and Satoru Kōsaki, written by Meg Rock, and was sung by cast member Emiri Katō (Mayoi Hachikuji); the second opening, "dreamy date drive", was composed by Satoru Kōsaki, written by Meg Rock, and sung by cast member Chiwa Saitō (Hitagi Senjougahara); the third opening, "dark cherry mystery", was composed by Mito, written by Meg Rock, and sung by cast member Kaori Mizuhashi (Ougi Oshino).

Zoku Owarimonogatari
Zoku Owarimonogatari was directed by Akiyuki Shinbo at Shaft, has animation character designs by Akio Watanabe, and features music composed by Kei Haneoka. Watanabe, Shinya Nishizawa, and Kana Miyai (now freelance after the dissolution of Studio Wanpack) served as the season's chief animation directors; and the season's scripts were written by Yukito Kizawa of Write Works under the supervision of Shinbo and Shaft. It was originally released as a film to Japanese theaters on November 10, 2018.

The season features two pieces of theme music: one opening theme, and one ending theme. "azure", the ending theme, was composed by Kōdai Akiba, written by Kei Hayashi, and performed by TrySail. The opening, "07734", was composed by Satoru Kōsaki and Mito, was written by Meg Rock, and features lines read by cast member Hiroshi Kamiya (Koyomi Araragi).

Film series

Kizumonogatari
The Kizumonogatari trilogy was directed by Tatsuya Oishi under the chief direction of Akiyuki Shinbo at Shaft, has animation character designs by Akio Watanabe and Hideyuki Morioka, and features music composed by Satoru Kōsaki. Morioka and Shaft animator Hiroki Yamamura served as the first film's animation directors and the second and third films' chief animation directors; and the trilogy's scripts were co-written by Yukito Kizawa and Muneo Nakamoto of Write Works under the supervision of Shinbo and Shaft.

The trilogy features two ending themes, both composed by Satoru Kōsaki and written by Meg Rock. The first, "étoile et toi", was used as the ending for the second film, and was sung by Clémentine. The second ending, an alternative version of the first titled "étoile et toi [édition le blanc]", features vocals by Clémentine and Ainhoa, and was used in the third film.

Original net animation

Koyomimonogatari
Koyomimonogatari was directed by Tomoyuki Itamura under the chief direction of Akiyuki Shinbo at Shaft, has animation character designs by Akio Watanabe, and features music composed by Satoru Kōsaki. Watanabe, Taisuke Iwasaki, and Shinya Nishizawa served as the season's chief animation directors; and the season's scripts were written by Muneo Nakamoto (episodes 1–2, 5–6, 9–12) and Yukito Kizawa (episodes 3–4, 7–8) of Write Works under the supervision of Shinbo and Shaft.

The season features various pieces of theme music; all of the opening themes were used in previous seasons, either belonging to Bakemonogatari, Nisemonogatari, Nekomonogatari (Black), Onimonogatari, Tsukimonogatari, or Owarimonogatari. One ending theme, unique to this season, was used: "whiz", which was composed and written by Shō Watanabe, and sung by TrySail.

Character commentaries
Audio commentaries are content available on the DVD/BD release of the series. Each episode features two characters having a conversation about the specific episode they are in. In Monogatari's case, the author of the series, Nisio Isin, has written each one of them.

 Bakemonogatari
  (Aniplex. 2009)
  (Aniplex. 2009)
  (Aniplex. 2009)
  (Aniplex. 2010)
  (Aniplex. 2010)
  (Aniplex. 2010)
 Nisemonogatari
  (Aniplex. 2012)
  (Aniplex. 2012)
  (Aniplex. 2012)
  (Aniplex. 2012)
  (Aniplex. 2012)
 Nekomonogatari (Kuro)
  (Aniplex. 2013)
  (Aniplex. 2013)
 Nekomonogatari (Shiro)
  (Aniplex. 2013)
  (Aniplex. 2013)
 Kabukimonogatari
  (Aniplex. 2013)
  (Aniplex. 2014)
 Otorimonogatari
  (Aniplex. 2014)
  (Aniplex. 2014)
 Onimonogatari
  (Aniplex. 2014)
  (Aniplex. 2014)
 Koimonogatari
  (Aniplex. 2014)
  (Aniplex. 2014)
 Hanamonogatari
  (Aniplex. 2014)
  (Aniplex. 2014)
 Tsukimonogatari
  (Aniplex. 2015)
  (Aniplex. 2015)
 Owarimonogatari
  (Aniplex. 2015)
  (Aniplex. 2016)
  (Aniplex. 2016)
  (Aniplex. 2016)
  (Aniplex. 2016)
  (Aniplex. 2017)
  (Aniplex. 2017)
  (Aniplex. 2017)
  (Aniplex. 2016)
 Kizumonogatari
  (Aniplex. 2016)
  (Aniplex. 2016)
  (Aniplex. 2017)
 Zoku Owarimonogatari
  (Aniplex. 2019)
  (Aniplex. 2019)

Recap episodes
These episodes aired throughout the run of the series.

Notes

References

External links
 Monogatari Series anime official website 

Monogatari (series)
Nisio Isin
Monogatari